Michael Angerschmid (born 24 February 1974) is an Austrian football manager. He is the Assistant head coach of Eintracht Frankfurt. Before his managerial career he was a career player for SV Ried.

Angerschmid played in the SV Ried squad that won the Austrian Cup in 1998.

References

External links
 Profile in SVR Inside Magazine (November 2013) 

Living people
1974 births
Austrian footballers
Austrian football managers
Austrian Football Bundesliga players
SV Ried players
SV Ried managers

Association football midfielders
VfL Wolfsburg non-playing staff